

League notes
The League admits the Winnipeg Braves.
The Winnipeg Barons Fold.
The Winnipeg Rangers move to Brandon, becoming the Brandon Rangers.
In January, the Rangers move back and are named the Transcona Rangers.

Regular season

Playoffs
Semi-Final
St. Boniface defeated Braves 3-games-to-2
Turnbull Cup Championship
Monarchs lost to St. Boniface 4-games-to-3
Western Memorial Cup Semi-Final
St. Boniface  defeated Fort William Canadiens (TBJHL) 4-games-to-1
Western Memorial Cup Final (Abbott Cup)
 St. Boniface lost to Regina Pats (SJHL) 4-games-to-2

Awards

All-Star Teams

References
Manitoba Junior Hockey League
Manitoba Hockey Hall of Fame
Hockey Hall of Fame
Winnipeg Free Press Archives
Brandon Sun Archives

MJHL
Manitoba Junior Hockey League seasons